Maršovice is a market town in Benešov District in the Central Bohemian Region of the Czech Republic. It has about 700 inhabitants.

Administrative parts
The villages and hamlets of Bezejovice, Dlouhá Lhota, Libeč, Mstětice, Podmaršovice, Řehovice, Strnadice, Tikovice, Vráce, Záhoří, Zahrádka, Zaječí, Zálesí 1.díl, Zálesí 2.díl and Zderadice are administrative parts of Maršovice.

Geography
It lies in a hilly landscape of the Benešov Uplands.

History
The first written mention of Maršovice is from 1205. The village was promoted to a market town in 1568 by Emperor Maximilian II.

Sights
The landmark of Maršovice is the Church of the Annunciation of the Virgin Mary. It was built in the late Baroque style in 1774–1775.

References

External links

Populated places in Benešov District
Market towns in the Czech Republic